Rubén Ignacio Moreira Valdez (b. Saltillo, Coahuila, April 18, 1963) is a Mexican politician.  He has a degree in Law from the Autonomous University of Coahuila (UAdeC) and in Social Sciences from the Superior Normal School of his state. He has a postgraduate degree in Politics and Educational Management at the Latin American Faculty of Social Sciences in Mexico and a master's degree in Governance and Human Rights at the Autonomous University of the Northeast. He has studied at the Universidad del Valle de Atemajac; the Carbonell Studies Center; the Monterrey Institute of Technology and Higher Education (ITESM); the Ibero-American University (UIA) and the University of Salamanca.

In the field of public administration, he has held various positions in the three orders of government.

In 2009 he was Federal Deputy for Saltillo, obtaining more than 73% of the votes. He served as Coordinator of the Parliamentary Fraction of Coahuila in the LXI Legislature, as well as, President of the Human Rights Commission and Member of the Culture commissions; National defense; among other

With 721,261 votes in his favor, on December 1, 2011, he was sworn in as Constitutional Governor of the State of Coahuila de Zaragoza, for the period 2011-2017.

In the Institutional Revolutionary Party (PRI), he has headed numerous areas, from the municipal level as Secretary of Elections of the Municipal Committee of Saltillo, Coahuila, to the national as General Secretary of the National Executive Committee of the PRI.

He has served as a professor in various universities and participated in numerous academic and editorial collaborations.

Biography

Formation

He has a degree in Law from the Autonomous University of Coahuila and in Social Sciences from the Superior Normal School of his state. He has a postgraduate degree in Politics and Educational Management at the Latin American Faculty of Social Sciences in Mexico and a master's degree in Governance and Human Rights from the Northeast Autonomous University. He has studied at the Universidad del Valle de Atemajac; the Carbonell Studies Center; the Monterrey Institute of Technology and Higher Education; the Universidad Iberoamericana and the University of Salamanca.

Public Function 
In the field of public administration, he has held the positions of Secretary of Agreement and Procedure of the Fourth Chamber of the Superior Court of Justice of Coahuila; Secretary of the City Council of Saltillo and Technical Secretary of the State Electoral Council.

In the Government of Coahuila, he served as Private Secretary and Under Secretary of Political Affairs of the Secretariat of Government; as well as, Assistant Secretary of Educational Planning and Legal Director of the Ministry of Public Education.

Popular Election Positions 
In 2009 he participated in the contest for Federal Deputy for District 4, with head in Saltillo, obtaining more than 73% of the votes (the highest percentage of votes obtained in an electoral district at the national level). In his management as a deputy, he served as Coordinator of the Parliamentary Fraction of Coahuila in the LXI Legislature, as well as, President of the Human Rights Commission and member of the Culture commissions; National defense; Concordia and Pacificación of Chiapas and the special commissions of Follow-up to the Aggressions to Journalists and Media; Analysis of the Fiscal Expenditure Budget and the Monitoring of the Correct Use of Federal, State and Municipal Resources in Electoral Processes. In that same period, he assumed the presidency of the Plural Working Group to follow up on the judicial process to former public servants of the state of Michoacán and was part of the Friendship Group with the Saharawi Arab Republic and the Republic of Cuba.

As a result of the highest vote in history in the entity, with 721,261 votes in their favor, which meant 61.48% of the total vote of that election, on December 1, 2011, he was sworn in as Constitutional Governor of the State of Coahuila from Zaragoza, for the period 2011-2017.

Main reforms promoted in the field of Human Rights during his government in Coahuila 
One of the central issues, from which, the state administration 2011-2017, gave an important transformation in the Coahuilense society was that of Human Rights. Based on the dialogue held with civil society and the academic sector, a critical work path was reflected in the Development Plan itself, particularly in the State Human Rights Program. So the following issues to be addressed were established:

 Rights of Missing Persons and their Family Members.
 Rights of Migrants.
 Rights of Mining Persons.
 Women's rights.
 Rights of Girls, Children and Adolescents.
 Food Rights.

Simultaneously, the following actions were implemented, among others:

 Creation of an Executive Human Rights Unit.

 Together with the Office in Mexico of the United Nations High Commissioner for Human Rights, the strengthening of a culture against discrimination and violence towards the LGBTTTI population in the entity was promoted through the Free and Equal Campaign.
 Reform to the Civil Code of the State through which the figure of equal marriage is introduced.
 Publication of a State Program for Equality and Non-Discrimination.
 As a measure of equality, the paternity leave was extended to six weeks.
 The publication of a State Law of Inclusion for Persons with Disabilities, which addresses this condition from a human rights perspective.

The state government 2011-2017, managed to consolidate Coahuila de Zaragoza as an entity where all people could enjoy and exercise their human rights without any limitation.

Partisan trajectory 
In the Institutional Revolutionary Party, he has served as Secretary of Elections of the Municipal Committee of Saltillo; member and advisor of the Confederation of Mexican Workers in Coahuila, as well as, Secretary of Electoral Action of the National Executive Committee of the CNOP. He has been a municipal, state and national Political Advisor; Representative before the State Electoral Council; Deputy Secretary-General of the State Steering Committee and Chairman of the State Steering Committee of the PRI in Coahuila. At the national level, he served as Secretary of Electoral Action; Secretary of Organization; General Secretary of the National Executive Committee of the PRI and Special Delegate for the extraordinary election of Monterrey, Nuevo León, in the 2018 Electoral Process.

Experience as an academic 
He has worked as a professor in the universities: Autónoma de Coahuila; Autonomous Northeast and at the State Institute for Teacher Training; as well as in the National College of Professional Studies and the Institute of Political Training.

Academic and editorial collaborations 
He has participated in various national and international conferences and forums, and has given numerous conferences. As an editorialist, he has collaborated in more than twenty newspapers of national circulation.

He has been a newspaper editorialist: El Universal, La Voz de Michoacán, Diario de Toluca, Cuarto Poder, Novedades de México, El Mexicano, Ocho Columnas, El Debate, Express and New Day, El Mercurio and El Tomorrow, Synthesis, La Voz, El Corregidor, Milenio Novedades; as well as Zócalo Saltillo, Monclova and Piedras Negras; Milenio-La Opinion of Torreón, El Diario, Vanguardia, El Heraldo and El Heraldo de México.

References

 Elecciones_estatales_de_Coahuila_de_2011

External links 

 6th Government of Coahuila's report
 Video on ADN Político
 Conference in Colegio de México
 Profile Interview
 Legislature Agenda (Actual Legislature)

Messages 

 Iniciative
 Positioning in matters of National Guard 
 Reservations of the Federation Revenue Law

Other links 

 Análisis de testimonios en juicios contra integrantes de los Zetas en San Antonio, Austin y del Río, Texas
 Respuesta del Destado de Coahuila al informe: “Atrocidades innegables. Confrontando crimenes de lesa humanidad en México”. Publicado por Open Society Foundations
 Informe de Trabajo del Grupo Autónomo de Trabajo en Coahuila
 Encuesta Nacional de Victimización y Percepción sobre Seguridad Publica (ENVIPE) INEGI
 La política del Estado de Coahuila en materia de Desarrollo Económico y Seguridad
 Indicadores Nacionales Coahuila 2011-2017
 de Actividades de la Comisión de Derechos Humanos de la Conferencia Nacional de Gobernadores
 Crónica de Acciones en materia de Derechos Humanos en Coahuila 2011-2017
 Investors ServiceCoahuila: la reforma de pensiones es positiva tanto para el Estado como para los municipios.

1963 births
Living people
Governors of Coahuila
Members of the Chamber of Deputies (Mexico) for Coahuila
Institutional Revolutionary Party politicians
Politicians from Saltillo
21st-century Mexican politicians
Autonomous University of Coahuila alumni
Academic staff of the Autonomous University of Coahuila
Deputies of the LXI Legislature of Mexico